The Harmon Doctrine, or the doctrine of absolute territorial sovereignty, holds that a country has absolute sovereignty over the territory and resources within its borders.

Background
The doctrine is named after U.S. Attorney General Judson Harmon, who made a comment during the Chamizal dispute, a dispute between USA and Mexico over the Rio Grande in 1895, in reference to international watercourses —

References

Further reading
What does international law say about water allocation? United Nations Economic Commission for Europe

Doctrines